Avtonomov (masculine) or Avtonomova (feminine) is a Russian last name. Variants of this surname include Avnatamov/Avnatamova (/), Avtamonov/Avtamonova (/), Avtomanov/Avtomanova (/), Avtoneyev/Avtoneyeva (/), Avtonoshkin/Avtonoshkina (/), and Antomanov/Antomanova (/).

All these surnames derive from patronymics which themselves derive from various forms of the male first name Avtonom (from Greek autonomos, meaning one that has/is living by one's own laws). The following people bear this surname:
Alexey Avtonomov, several people
Darya Avtonomova, Russian gymnast, a medalist in the Senior Group Finals at the 2014 Rhythmic Gymnastics European Championships
Natalya Avtonomova, contributor to the proceedings of the 20th World Congress of Philosophy
Nikolai Avtonomov (1894–1979), former Orthodox clergyman who converted to Eastern Catholicism

See also
Kozma Spassky-Avtonomov (1807–1890), Russian geographer and climatologist

References

Notes

Sources
И. М. Ганжина (I. M. Ganzhina). "Словарь современных русских фамилий" (Dictionary of Modern Russian Last Names). Москва, 2001. 



Russian-language surnames